Mohammad Fayez al-Barasha (born 1955) is a Syrian politician from the Syrian Communist Party. Since 2021, he has served in the Second Hussein Arnous government as Minister of State for Investment Affairs and Vital Projects.

Personal life
He is married with two children.

References 

Living people
1955 births
Politicians from Damascus
Syrian communists
21st-century Syrian politicians
Government ministers of Syria